To the Ladies is a 1923 American silent comedy film produced by Famous Players-Lasky and released by Paramount Pictures. It is based on a 1922 Broadway play, To the Ladies, by George S. Kaufman and Marc Connelly.

The film was directed by James Cruze and starred Edward Everett Horton, Theodore Roberts and Louise Dresser. Also in a bit part is young Mary Astor.

Cast
Edward Everett Horton as Leonard Beebe
Theodore Roberts as John Kincaid
Helen Jerome Eddy as Elsie Beebe
Louise Dresser as Mrs. Kincaiid
Z. Wall Covington as Chester Mullin
Arthur Hoyt as Tom Baker
Jack Gardner as Bob Cutter
Patricia Palmer as Mary Mullin
Mary Astor as Bit

Preservation status
This is now considered a lost film.

References

External links

1923 films
American silent feature films
Films directed by James Cruze
Lost American films
American films based on plays
1923 comedy films
Silent American comedy films
American black-and-white films
1923 lost films
Lost comedy films
1920s American films